Villentrois-Faverolles-en-Berry is a commune in the Indre department in central France. It was established on 1 January 2019 by merger of the former communes of Villentrois (the seat) and Faverolles-en-Berry.

See also
Communes of the Indre department

References 

Communes of Indre